"Looking Back" is a song written by Brook Benton, Belford Hendricks, and Clyde Otis and performed by Nat King Cole. It reached #2 on the U.S. R&B chart and #5 on the U.S. pop chart in 1958.

The single's B-side, "Do I Like It?" reached #67 on the U.S. pop chart in 1958.

The song was ranked #31 on Billboard's Year-End Hot 100 singles of 1958.

Other charting versions
Cole re-released a version of the song in 1965 which reached #27 on the adult contemporary chart and #123 on the U.S. pop chart.
Joe Simon released a version of the song as a single in 1969 which reached #42 on the U.S. R&B chart and #70 on the U.S. pop chart.

Other versions
Dinah Washington released a version of the song as the B-side to her 1960 single "We Have Love".
Marty Robbins released a version of the song on his 1962 album Marty After Midnight.
Jan Howard featuring The Jordanaires released a version of the song on her 1962 album Sweet and Sentimental.
Brook Benton released a version of the song on his 1962 album Lie to Me - Brook Benton Singing the Blues.
Jewel Brown released a version of the song as the B-side to her 1962 single "I Ain't Givin' Up Nothing".
Mary Wells released a version of the song on her 1963 album Two Lovers and Other Great Hits.
Earl Grant released a version of the song on his 1966 album Sings and Plays Songs Made Famous by Nat Cole.
Carla Thomas released a version of the song on her 1966 album Carla.
Ruth Brown released a version of the song on her 1969 album Black is Brown and Brown is Beautiful.
Nancy Wilson released a version of the song on her 1969 album Nancy.
Gene Vincent released a version of the song on his 1970 album The Day the World Turned Blue.
Conway Twitty released a version of the song on his 1972 album 20 Greatest Hits by Conway Twitty.
Inez Andrews released a version of the song on her 1973 album Lord, Don't Move the Mountain.
Gregory Isaacs covered the song in 1974. 
New Orleans artist Irma Thomas released a version of this song on her 1979 album “Safe With Me” and it received considerable airplay on the local radio stations, especially those using an oldies format.
Bobby Bland released a version of the song on his 1984 album You've Got Me Loving You.  He also released it as a single the same year, but it did not chart.
Maria Muldaur released a version of the song on her 1986 album Transblucency.
Don Williams released a version of the song on his 1987 album Traces.
Ray Price released a version of the song on his 1988 album Just Enough Love.
Johnny Adams released a version of the song on his 1998 album Man of My Word.
The Blind Boys of Alabama released a version of the song on their 2003 album I Brought Him with Me.

References

1958 songs
1958 singles
1965 singles
1969 singles
Songs written by Brook Benton
Songs written by Clyde Otis
Nat King Cole songs
Dinah Washington songs
Marty Robbins songs
Jan Howard songs
Brook Benton songs
Mary Wells songs
Ruth Brown songs
Gene Vincent songs
Conway Twitty songs
Bobby Bland songs
Don Williams songs
Ray Price (musician) songs
Johnny Adams songs
Capitol Records singles
Songs written by Belford Hendricks